The Riverway Stadium is an international standard cricket and AFL stadium in Thuringowa Central, Townsville, Queensland, Australia. The stadium is a part of the Riverway sporting and cultural complex.

Facilities
The stadium includes the oval, a 1013-seat grandstand and supporting facilities, a practice oval and cricket practice nets. The design was modeled on Brisbane's Gabba cricket ground specifications and has a six turf wicket block. Riverway Stadium has a maximum capacity of 10,000+ This was achieved on New Year's Eve 2007 when 10,024 people attended a Twenty20 cricket match between Queensland and Victoria. The stadium is also home to the Thuringowa Bulldogs AFL club, and the AFL's local regional office. In June 2009, the stadium hosted a 4-day first class match between Pakistan A and the Australia A cricket team. The stadium also hosted some matches of the 2012 ICC Under-19 Cricket World Cup which was held in Australia from 11 August 2012. India emerged as the winner of Under-19 Cricket World Cup after beating Australia in the final at the Riverway Stadium.

In November 2014, the stadium hosted its first international match between debutants Papua New Guinea and Hong Kong. The Stadium became the 10th ODI venue in Australia.

The stadium hosted Townsville's first AFL game for premiership points on 15 June 2019 when the Gold Coast Suns took a home game to Riverway Stadium against St Kilda.

Lighting

In 2008, the inadequacy of the current "temporary" lighting was highlighted when a Queensland v Western Australia AFL representative match was rescheduled from dusk to mid afternoon. Costs to install lighting adequate for televised sport have been estimated at five million dollars.

Attendance records

Top 5 Sports Attendance Records

Last updated on 15 June 2019

International cricket
In October 2014, Riverway Stadium received ICC-accreditation as an international venue. It hosted a two-match ODI series featuring Hong Kong and Papua New Guinea in November 2014, with the latter making their ODI debut. PNG won the series 2-0.

In February 2016, the stadium hosted a three-match T20I series featuring Ireland and Papua New Guinea, which was won by Ireland (2-1). A 2015-2017 ICC Intercontinental Cup match was also played between the two teams, which Ireland won by 145 runs.

In 2022, the ground served as the venue for Australia's home ODI series against Zimbabwe. The hosts won the first two matches comfortably, but were stunned in the final match, which Zimbabwe won by three wickets.

One Day Internationals hosted 
As of September 2022, the stadium has hosted the following ODI matches.

International centuries
One ODI century has been scored at the venue.

International five-wicket hauls
Two ODI five-wicket hauls have been taken at the venue.

Twenty20 Internationals hosted

References

External links
 

Cricket grounds in Queensland
Australian rules football grounds
Sports venues in Townsville
North East Australian Football League grounds